Sukumar Hansda (1956/1957 – 29 October 2020) was an Indian politician who served as Minister for Paschimanchal Unnayan Affairs in the Government of West Bengal. He was also a MLA, elected from the Jhargram constituency in the 2011 West Bengal state assembly election. He also served as the Deputy Speaker of the West Bengal Legislative Assembly.

Sukumar Hansda died of prostate cancer, aged 63, on 29 October 2020, at a private hospital in Kolkata and tested positive for COVID-19.

References 

1954 births
2020 deaths
State cabinet ministers of West Bengal
West Bengal MLAs 2011–2016
West Bengal MLAs 2016–2021
Trinamool Congress politicians from West Bengal
People from Jhargram district
Deaths from cancer in India
Deaths from the COVID-19 pandemic in India
Deputy Speakers of the West Bengal Legislative Assembly